The 2010 Samsung Securities Cup was a professional tennis tournament played on hard courts. It was the eleventh edition of the tournament which was part of the 2010 ATP Challenger Tour. It took place in Seoul, South Korea between 18 and 24 October 2010.

ATP entrants

Seeds

 Rankings are as of October 11, 2010.

Other entrants
The following players received wildcards into the singles main draw:
  Cho Soong-jae
  Chung Hong
  Lu Yen-hsun
  Noh Sang-woo

The following players received entry from the qualifying draw:
  Treat Conrad Huey
  Nam Ji-sung
  Ante Pavić
  Daniel Yoo

Champions

Singles

 Lu Yen-hsun def.  Kevin Anderson, 6–3, 6–4

Doubles

 Rameez Junaid /  Frank Moser def.  Vasek Pospisil /  Adil Shamasdin, 6–3, 6–4

External links
ITF Search 
ATP official site

Samsung Securities Cup
Samsung Securities Cup
Samsung